Marie Šmídová (born 15 June 1966) is a Czech handball player. She competed in the women's tournament at the 1988 Summer Olympics.

References

External links
 

1966 births
Living people
Czech female handball players
Olympic handball players of Czechoslovakia
Handball players at the 1988 Summer Olympics
People from Cheb
Sportspeople from the Karlovy Vary Region